The Candy Tangerine Man is a 1975 American action-adventure blaxploitation film starring John Daniels, Eli Haines and Tom Hankason. Distributed by Moonstone Entertainment, it follows the story of the powerful "Black Baron" (Daniels), both a pimp and a doting father. The film was directed and produced by Matt Cimber and written by Mikel Angel under the pseudonym of George Theakos.

Plot
A successful Los Angeles-based businessperson, doting father of two and a loving husband, Ron Lewis (John Daniels) turns into a completely different self at night – his alter ego, the "Black Baron", a prominent, powerful and feared pimp; but after killing two racist police officers in his pursuit, the Baron realises that his pimping days are numbered.

Cast
 John Daniels as Ron Lewis / The Black Baron
 Eli Haines
 Tom Hankason
 Marva Farmer
 Richard Kennedy as Dempsey
 George Buck Flower as Gordon
 Meri McDonald as "Sugar"
 Marilyn Joi as Clarisse 
 Talley Cochrane as Midge
 Patrick Wright as Floyd "Big Floyd"
 Mikel Angel as Vincent De Nunzio

See also
 List of American films of 1975

References

External links
 

1975 films
Blaxploitation films
American crime action films
1970s action adventure films
American action adventure films
1970s crime action films
Films about prostitution in the United States
American exploitation films
1970s English-language films
1970s American films